Colleen Gleason is an American writer.

Biography 
Colleen Gleason lives near Ann Arbor, Michigan with her husband and children. She has a degree in English and a MBA from the University of Michigan. She started writing in primary school and wrote nine complete stories before selling the first book of her The Gardella Vampire Chronicles series to a division of Penguin Books, which published it in January 2007: the series arrives at a conclusion on March 2009. In 2008 she wrote a short story, a prequel to the series, titled In Which a Masquerade Ball Unmasks an Undead, published first in the Mammoth Book of Vampire Romance, then as Victoria Gardella: Vampire Slayer. Before becoming a full-time writer, she worked in sales and marketing and started her own business in the insurance field.

In 2010, she started the six-novel series The Envy Chronicles, written using the pen name Joss Ware. In 2011, she wrote The Regency Draculia trilogy.

She has also written short stories. In 2010, she collaborated with Mary Balogh, Susan Krinard and Janet Mullany in a paranormal tribute to Jane Austen, writing "Northanger Castle" for the book Bespelling Jane Austen, published on October 1, 2010.

Bibliography

Series

The Gardella Vampire Chronicles 
 The Rest Falls Away (January 2, 2007)
 Rises the Night (June 2, 2007)
 The Bleeding Dusk (February 5, 2008)
 When Twilight Burns (August 5, 2008)
 As Shadows Fade (March 3, 2009)
 Roaring Midnight (June 18, 2013)
 Roaring Shadows (August 2015)
 Roaring Dawn (July 2016)

Envy Chronicles 
 Beyond the Night (2010)
 Embrace the Night Eternal (2010)
 Abandon the Night (March 2010)
 Night Betrayed (January 2011)
 Night Forbidden (August 2012)

The Regency Draculia Series 
 The Vampire Voss (March 22, 2011)
 The Vampire Dimitri (April 19, 2011)
 The Vampire Narcise (May 24, 2011)

Medieval Herb Garden 
 Lavender Vows (2011)
 Sanctuary of Roses (March 15, 2011)
 A Whisper Of Rosemary (April 1, 2011)

Stoker & Holmes 
 The Clockwork Scarab (September 17, 2013)
 The Spiritglass Charade (October 4, 2014)
 The Chess Queen Enigma (October 6, 2015)
 The Carnelian Crow (July 1, 2017)
The Zeppelin Deception (2019)

Novels 
 Siberian Treasure (February 4, 2011)
 The Cards of Life and Death (March 4, 2011)
 The Shop of Shades and Secrets (May 3, 2011)

Short stories
"In Which a Masquerade Ball Unmasks an Undead" in The Mammoth Book of Vampire Romance (2008) 
"Northanger Castle" in Bespelling Jane Austen (2010)

References

External links
 
 Official website (as Joss Ware)

Year of birth missing (living people)
21st-century American novelists
American science fiction writers
American women novelists
Living people
Writers from Detroit
Ross School of Business alumni
Women science fiction and fantasy writers
21st-century American women writers
University of Michigan College of Literature, Science, and the Arts alumni
Novelists from Michigan